Old Darülfünun building was a university building constructed next to Haghia Sophia in Istanbul, Ottoman Empire in the mid 19th century.

It was a three-storey building in neo-Renaissance style that had a great visual impact on Istanbul's urban character. The building's designer was Swiss architect Gaspare Fossati (1809—1883), who was also responsible for extensive restoration of Hagia Sophia.

After its construction as a university building in 1854, it was passed on to the Ministries of Finance and then on to the Ministry of Justice and Foundation. Later it was also used by the Ottoman Parliament, and finally served as Palace of Justice. It was destroyed by a fire in 1933.

See also
 Great Palace of Constantinople

References

Demolished buildings and structures in Istanbul
Istanbul University
1933 fires in Europe
School buildings completed in 1854
Buildings and structures demolished in 1933
Burned buildings and structures in Turkey
19th-century architecture in Turkey